Prince of Wales Island (Tlingit: Taan) is one of the islands of the Alexander Archipelago in the Alaska Panhandle. It is the fourth-largest island in the United States (after Hawaii, Kodiak Island, and Puerto Rico) and the 97th-largest island in the world.

Geography and ecology
Approximately 6,000 people live on the island. Craig is the largest community; founded as a saltery in the early 20th century, it has a population of 1,500. Some 900 people live in Klawock, a long-established village that grew with the fishing industry. Hollis was a boom and bust mining town from 1900 to about 1915. Abandoned, it was re-established as a logging camp in the 1950s. It now has a population of 100 and is the location of the ferry terminal.

Fjords, steep-sided mountains, and dense forests characterize the island.

Moist, maritime conditions dominate the weather.

The Tongass National Forest covers most of the island. Within the forest and on the island are the Karta River Wilderness and the South Prince of Wales Wilderness. Many of its wildlife, such as the Prince of Wales flying squirrel (Glaucomys sabrinus griseifrons) and Prince of Wales Island ermine
(Mustela haidarum celenda) are found nowhere else.

The island is in the Prince of Wales-Hyder Census Area.

History
Prince of Wales Island is the homeland of the indigenous Tlingit people. Tlingit word , which translates to "crabapple country". The island is traditional Tlingit territory. The Haida migrated into the area in the late 18th century. Abandoned Haida villages still have Tlingit names. 

In 1741, Aleksei Chirikov, commanding a ship on Vitus Bering's second voyage of exploration out of Kamchatka, made the first recorded European landfall on the northwest coast of North America at Baker Island off the west coast of Prince of Wales Island. He did not stop for any length of time there. The next European arrival was in 1774, when Juan Pérez led a Spanish expedition sailing in a  boat from La Paz, Mexico (then a Spanish colony). They reached Sumez Island off of Prince of Wales' west coast.

In 1779 a British expedition under Captain James Cook passed  Prince of Wales Island. Comte de La Perouse led a French expedition to the area in 1786. Karta Bay is the site of the first salmon saltery in Alaska.

On September 20, 1793, British navy officer George Vancouver gave the name "Prince of Wales Archipelago" to all the islands of the southern Alexander Archipelago, which he suspected to have a single major island; the name referred to George, Prince of Wales, who would later become King George IV. By 1825 the name "Prince of Wales Island" was being used for the largest of the islands in Vancouver's archipelago.

Settlers began mining of gold, copper, and other metals on the island in the late 19th century, as European Americans entered the area to exploit the natural resources. Gold production came from underground lode mines exploiting: gold-bearing quartz veins in metamorphic rocks (such as the Gold Standard, Sea Level, Dawson, Golden Fleece and Goldstream mines); skarns (at the Jumbo and Kassan Peninsula copper-gold mines); zoned mafic-ultramafic plutons, as at the Salt Chuck silver-gold-copper-PGE mine; and VMS deposits such as Niblack. Uranium was mined at Bokan Mountain in the 1950s and 1970s.

Economy

Logging
Historically, logging was the mainstay of the collective Prince of Wales economy through most of the 20th century. The decline of the industry since the late 20th century has resulted in only a few small-scale sawmills operating. In 1975, the Point Baker Association and others sued the United States Forest Service to prevent logging  on the northern portion of the island.

In March 1976, the United States Congress responded to the suit by passing the National Forest Management Act, which removed the injunction. Still, only half of the marketable timber was cut on the north end of the island.

Road construction and logging on the north end of the island at Labouchere Bay commenced early in 1975. Living on a floating camp beginning with the retired tugboat Irene leased as a floating hotel, employees of Robertson & Sons began cutting trees, clearing stumps, and blasting rock in order to build pads for mobile trailers for both the road construction and logging families. The camps were ready in early June for Robertson employees to bring in their families. Under the supervision of the US Forest Service, logging began in 1976.

In 2010, Senators Lisa Murkowski and Mark Begich  introduced S730 to privatize stands of old growth forests on the island.

Tourism
Tourism, including sport fishing, is an important part in Prince of Wales' economy. Two factors have led to the increase of tourism on the island. Roads built for the logging companies years ago have enabled better access to different parts of the island for hiking and camping. The second was the new Inter-Island Ferry Authority.

Fishing
Commercial fishing provides the foundation of the economy for numerous towns on the island including Craig, Klawock, Hydaburg, Port Protection and Point Baker. During the summer, trollers and seiners both fish for all five species of Pacific salmon. Longliners bring up halibut and black cod. Dungeness crab and shrimp seasons are open throughout the year. During the winter there are dive fisheries for geoducks, sea cucumbers, and sea urchins.

Government
Since Prince of Wales Island is almost entirely made up of federal land, the two ranger districts (Craig and Thorne Bay) on the island provide employment for a number of residents.

Mining
Mineral exploration continues at many projects on Prince of Wales Island. The only producing uranium mine in the entire state of Alaska was located on the island, the Ross-Adams mine in Kendrick Bay. Current remediation projects have been reported in local media, and continued exploration of rare earth metals continue in the region. Bokan Mountain has been rated by the Technology Metals report as a location (tied with Canada's Strange Lake) containing the third highest of "relative" quantity of individual critical rare earth oxides, a way of comparing rare earth mine reserves. In 2012 the Pentagon issued a contract to perform a mineralogical and metallurgical study of the mountain.  "The Bokan – Dotson ridge REE" rare earth deposit on Bokan Mountain owned by Ucore is estimated to hold  of heavy rare earths with  dysprosium. It is a small deposit on a global basis but the largest in the United States. , the mine was still in the planning stages. Ucore Rare Metals Inc. paid about $1 million for a  claim to the family of a prospector who held uranium claims for many years on Bokan Mountain.

Transportation

Roads
A road system, which taxpayers paid for in credits to logging contractors, was built on the island. However, many of these roads are now being decommissioned as unnecessary in the post-clearcutting era. Only a small percentage of this road system is paved, currently no further than the Whale Pass turn-off. The gravel roads cost between 150,000 and 500,000 per mile in today's dollars. Point Baker and Port Protection chose in 1974 not to be connected to the road system.

There is now a newly designated state "scenic highway" - the  Prince of Wales Island road system. The highway reaches almost every community on Prince of Wales.

Cargo
A few companies provide scheduled barge service from Pacific coast ports to southeastern Alaskan ports, including those on Prince of Wales island, primarily Craig and Thorne Bay.

Public ferry

Alaska Marine Highway System

Historically, the Alaska Marine Highway (AMHS) intermittently served the port of Hollis, until the Inter-Island Ferry Authority began regular scheduled service.

Inter-Island Ferry Authority

The Inter-Island Ferry Authority (IFA) provides daily service on a three-hour, 36-mile route between Prince of Wales Island and Ketchikan. The idea of starting a shuttle ferry service was discussed among communities of Klawock, Craig, Thorne Bay, Coffman Cove on the Prince of Wales Island as well as Petersburg and Wrangell in 1997, which would serve on regular timetable. Budget was fixed with the Alaska Congressional delegation as the state Department of Transportation supported the plan to be organized under the Municipal Port Authority Act of Alaska in 1998, and two vessels introduced between 2002 and 2006 have expanded routes from Hollis–Ketchikan to serve north by Clark Bay.

It ferries more than 50,000 passengers and 12,000 vehicles between Hollis and Ketchikan annually. The system is more than a form of transportation - it is an economic engine for southern Southeast Alaska, generating jobs, commerce, and tourism - while also increasing community well-being. In 2015, the IFA brought 3,000 tourists to Prince of Wales Island, where they spent more than $10 million on hotels, fishing expeditions, and dining - generating hundreds of summer jobs across the island. It provides a means for the seafood industry to move millions of pounds of high-quality, high-value fresh and live seafood to market, creating hundreds more jobs. It provides access to health care for a thousand island residents who use Ketchikan's medical services without the cost, inconvenience, or weather-related delays of flying. It shuttles workers to their jobs, reinforcing Ketchikan's status as the regional economic hub; Prince of Wales residents spent more than $14 million there in 2015 on groceries, goods, services, and medical care.

The Inter-Island Ferry allows for cultural and social commerce as well. Students, tribal members, and other residents use the system to participate in basketball games, totem pole raisings, trainings, college fairs, celebrations, and funerals. There were 3,100 student trips last year. This allowed students from 13 different Alaska school districts the opportunity to challenge themselves and interact with their peers. It connects residents to family, friends, and recreation.

The ferry is a critical piece of a more extensive transportation network. It provides transportation security on days when the skies are rough, and access to transportation to those who cannot afford alternative means. Nearly a quarter of the ridership last year were senior citizens and young children, who have saved a combined $17 million over the cost of flying since the system began in 2002. Its reliable arrivals and departures - so precise that people are said to set their watches by it - have enabled organizations to build their business models around this daily transportation connection. The result of the IFA's efficient operations is farebox revenue that covers a full 85% of the ferry's operational costs, a significant rate in the world of public transportation. The word businesses and residents most frequently use to describe the ferry service is "invaluable." While there are many intrinsic values of the system that cannot be measured, an analysis of the ferry's economic impact in the seafood, healthcare, visitor, transportation, and retail sectors shows an impressive $52.2 million combined impact in Ketchikan and Prince of Wales in 2015.

Airports
Klawock Airport  is the only airport on Prince of Wales island.
At least two commercial airlines in Ketchikan provide scheduled service to Prince of Wales island.
Air taxi or chartered flights are also available from them and other airlines.

Seaplane bases

Scheduled airlines

Communities

Coffman Cove
Craig
Hollis
Hydaburg
Kasaan
Klawock
Naukati Bay
Point Baker
Port Protection
Port St. Nicholas
Thorne Bay
Waterfall
Whale Pass

Notable ex-residents
Holly Madison, American model and Hugh Hefner's former girlfriend.
Elizabeth Peratrovich and Roy Peratrovich, early Alaskan civil rights advocates, heavily involved in passage of Alaska's Anti-Discrimination Act of 1945, first civil rights law in the U.S.  Elizabeth Peratrovich Day is Alaska's equivalent of Martin Luther King Day.

See also
 On Your Knees Cave (Shuká Káa)

References

General references

External links
Prince of Wales Chamber of Commerce

Islands of the Alexander Archipelago
Haida
Islands of Prince of Wales–Hyder Census Area, Alaska
Russian America
Islands of Alaska
Islands of Unorganized Borough, Alaska